Umar ibn Ibrahim ibn Waqid al-Umari was a ninth century governor of the Yemen for the Abbasid Caliphate.

A descendant of the second Rashidun caliph Umar ibn al-Khattab, Umar was appointed as governor shortly after the death of the caliph al-Amin in 813. He remained in office for less than a year, during which time he carried out instructions to arrest his predecessor Yazid ibn Jarir al-Qasri, and was dismissed in mid-814.

Notes

References 
 
 
 

Abbasid governors of Yemen
9th-century people from the Abbasid Caliphate
9th-century Arabs
9th century in Yemen